The 2010 Sam Houston State Bearkats football team represented Sam Houston State University as a member of the Southland Conference during the 2010 NCAA Division I FCS football season. Led by first-year head coach Willie Fritz, the Bearkats compiled an overall record of 6–5 with a mark of 4–3 in conference play, and finished tied for third in the Southland.

Schedule

References

Sam Houston State
Sam Houston Bearkats football seasons
Sam Houston State Bearkats football